Wa-pii-moos-toosis 83A ( wâpi-moscosis) is an Indian reserve of the Star Blanket Cree Nation in Saskatchewan. In 2016, its Community Well-Being index was calculated at 61 of 100, compared to 58.4 for the average First Nations community and 77.5 for the average non-Indigenous community. The name of the locality means "White Calf".

It is located near the east end of Mission Lake, on the north shore and adjacent to Lebret. It was also the location of the Qu'Appelle Indian Residential School.

See also
List of Indian reserves in Saskatchewan

References

Indian reserves in Saskatchewan
Division No. 6, Saskatchewan
Star Blanket Cree Nation